Hazardous Valley is a 1927 American silent drama film directed by Alan James and starring Sheldon Lewis, Virginia Brown Faire and David Torrence.

Cast
 Vincent Brownell	
 Virginia Brown Faire	
 Sheldon Lewis	
 Pat Harmon		
 David Torrence	
 Andrew Arbuckle		
 Burr McIntosh

References

Bibliography
 Robert B. Connelly. The Silents: Silent Feature Films, 1910-36, Volume 40, Issue 2. December Press, 1998.

External links
 

1927 films
1927 drama films
1920s English-language films
American silent feature films
Silent American drama films
American black-and-white films
Films directed by Alan James
1920s American films